Guilherme Vinícius Quichini dos Santos (born 15 December 1993), known as Guilherme or Guilherme Quichini, is a Brazilian football player who plays for Famalicão.

Club career
He made his professional debut in the Segunda Liga for Famalicão on 9 October 2016 in a game against Sporting Covilhã.

References

1993 births
Footballers from São Paulo
Living people
Brazilian footballers
Nacional Atlético Clube (SP) players
Timbaúba Futebol Clube players
F.C. Famalicão players
Brazilian expatriate footballers
Expatriate footballers in Portugal
Liga Portugal 2 players
Association football defenders